Margherita Cecilia Brigida Lucia Maria Albanesi (8 October 1899—9 December 1923) was a British stage and film actress.

Life and career
She was born in London on 8 October 1899. Her father was Italian-born Carlo Albanesi (1856-1926), a pianist and teacher at Royal Academy of Music, while her mother was Effie Adelaide Rowlands, a writer who published over 100 romance novels. She attended the Royal Academy of Dramatic Art, and appeared on the stage in The School for Scandal, Mr. Todd's Experiment and A Pair of Spectacles. She appeared in small film roles in The Romance of Old Bill, Darby and Joan and Mr. Wu.

She enjoyed a successful theatre career, starring in plays such as Galsworthy's The First and the Last, opposite Owen Nares. She was soon being hailed by critics as one of the brightest prospects in British acting.

Death

After making just six films, Albanesi died at the age of 24 in Broadstairs, Kent, on 9 December 1923, of intestinal obstruction and laparotomy, allegedly as a result of an illegal abortion. She was buried in St Pancras Cemetery in central London.

Albanesi had a relationship with the theatre and film producer Basil Dean who continued to be obsessed with her after her death. Dean was first attracted to his wife the actress Victoria Hopper because of her physical resemblance to Albanesi and cast her in a number of his productions. His final film as a director 21 Days was based on a play, The First and the Last on which he had worked with Albanesi. 

Dean commissioned Eric Gill to create a memorial plaque to Albanesi, which can be seen in the foyer of the St Martin's Theatre, West Street, London. Her friend Noël Coward dedicated the first published text of his play The Rat Trap to the "dear memory of Meggie Albanesi" in 1924.

Selected filmography
 The Romance of Old Bill, dir. George Pearson (1918)
 Mr. Wu, dir. Maurice Elvey (1919)
 Darby and Joan, dir. Percy Nash (1920)
 The Skin Game, dir. B. E. Doxat-Pratt (1921)
 The Great Day, dir. Hugh Ford (1921)
 Det omringade huset (The House Surrounded), dir. Victor Sjöström (1922)

References

Bibliography

External links
 
 

1899 births
1923 deaths
Actresses from London
English stage actresses
English film actresses
English silent film actresses
English people of Italian descent
Alumni of RADA
20th-century English actresses